Webster County High School may refer to several schools in the United States:

Webster County High School (Georgia), a school in Preston, Georgia
Webster County High School (Kentucky), a school in Dixon, Kentucky
Webster County High School (West Virginia), a school in Upperglade, West Virginia